Andrey Vasilievich Farnosov (born 9 July 1980) is a Russian track and field athlete who mainly competes in the 3000 metres steeplechase.

International competitions

References

1980 births
Living people
Russian male middle-distance runners
Russian male steeplechase runners
World Athletics Championships athletes for Russia
Russian Athletics Championships winners